Russell T. Whitt (born July 6, 1971) is the head strength and conditioning coach for the Troy Trojans football team in Troy, AL. He previously served as an assistant S&C coach with the Army Black Knights football team at the United States Military Academy in West Point, NY in 2019 and as the head S&C coach for the Texas Tech Red Raiders football team in Lubbock, TX from 2016−2018 and the Louisiana-Lafayette Ragin' Cajuns football team in Lafayette, LA from 2010−2016.

Playing career
Whitt played safety and linebacker for Abilene Christian University in Abilene, Texas, from 1990−1994. He graduated in 1994, earning a bachelors of science degree in police science and administration.

Coaching career

Midwestern State Mustangs
From August 1995–96, Whitt began his career as a graduate assistant football coach and strength and conditioning coach at Midwestern State University, where he developed strength programs for football, men's soccer, volleyball, and men's and women's basketball. He introduced a comprehensive speed, flexibility, and agility development program for football and soccer, and tested his skills as a linebackers, and defensive ends coach.

Texas Longhorns
Whitt was a graduate assistant in the University of Texas Department of Strength and Conditioning for varsity football, baseball and men's basketball from June 1997 – May 1997, where the Longhorns were inaugural Big XXII Champions (Football 1996), and played in the Fiesta Bowl in 1997.
 
Whitt earned his Masters of Education in Kinesiology while at Texas in 1997.

The US Olympic Training Center
Whitt coordinated speed and agility development for the 1997 Team USA men's and women's volleyball, and assisted in program development for all sports, including USA basketball, and wrestling.

The College of William and Mary Tribe
Whitt was an assistant strength and conditioning coach for The College of William & Mary football team for the 1997 season as well as being designated as the head strength coach for Olympic Sports.

University of Louisville Cardinals
Whitt was an assistant strength and conditioning coach for the University of Louisville football team for the 1998 season, as well as the speed and agility coordinator for the freshmen football athletes.

Sam Houston State Bearkats
In the five years Whitt spent with the Sam Houston State Bearkats (1998−2003), he was the head strength and conditioning coach for eleven Division I varsity sports.  He also served as an instructor in the school's kinesiology department as well as assisted in the design of a new weight facility.

Rice Owls
Three months after completing a six-year stint in the Army, Whitt returned to coaching as the assistant coordinator of strength and conditioning at Rice University.  While only there for the 2009 season, he developed training and recovery programs for the Owls' football, baseball, swimming, and track & field teams.

Louisiana−Lafayette Ragin' Cajuns
In October 2010, Coach Whitt was hired as the strength and conditioning coach to oversee 12 NCAA sports at the University of Louisiana, Lafayette. Whitt developed a plan for a $750,000 equipment and infrastructure overhaul for ULL athletics and provided the design for a 12,250 square-foot performance center which was completed in September 2015.

Texas Tech Red Raiders
In January 2016, Whitt was hired as the new head strength and conditioning coach for the Texas Tech Red Raiders by head football coach Kliff Kingsbury At Tech, Whitt introduced a program called "4th Quarter Combatives," which applied mixed martial arts themed conditioning to football training. Whitt also introduced "velocity based training" using technology to measure bar speed for Olympic lifts.  While at Texas Tech, Whitt oversaw three full-time assistants as well as a graduate assistant.  He was let go along with the rest of the Texas Tech staff following the 2018 season when new coach Matt Wells took over.

Army Black Knights
On February 19, 2019, the United States Military Academy Athletic Department announced the hire of Whitt as an assistant football strength and conditioning coach under head football coach Jeff Monken and head football strength and conditioning coach Conor Hughes. He spent one season with the Black Knights before moving on to take another head S&C position.

Troy Trojans
On February 8, 2020, Troy head head football Chip Lindsey announced the hire of Whitt as the head football strength and conditioning coach.

Military career
From 2003 to 2009, Whitt was a communication sergeant in the 10th Special Forces Group of the United States Army. He was awarded the combat infantryman's badge (2007), two Iraqi campaign medals, and the Army commendation medal with valor.

Whitt left his job at Sam Houston State to join the Army, but continued his work in strength and conditioning to enhance training, most notably developing and initiating a comprehensive pre-deployment conditioning program for his Special Forces team prior to their two deployments.

In 2016, Whitt was named as a finalist for the Armed Forces Merit Bowl Award.

References

1971 births
Living people
American strength and conditioning coaches
Sam Houston Bearkats football coaches
Texas Longhorns coaches
Texas Tech Red Raiders football coaches
University of Texas alumni
Sportspeople from Texas
Players of American football from Texas
People from Azle, Texas